Sheikh Bhikhari (1819–1858) was a combatant in the Indian Rebellion of 1857. He was a Dewan and general of Tikait Umrao Singh.  He was born in Budmu, Bihar to a weaver Ansari family but spent the rest of his life in Khudia-Lotwa village of Ormanjhi.  Along with his contemporary, Tikait Umrao Singh, he prevented East India Company forces from occupying Ranchi by cutting down Chutupalu Ghati trees in order to obstruct their advance prior to engaging Company forces. The British hanged him alongside Tikait Umrao Singh in a banyan tree of Chutupalu Ghati in Ramgarh in 1858.

References 

Indian independence activists
1819 births
1858 deaths
Revolutionaries of the Indian Rebellion of 1857